Marion Orr may refer to:

Marion Alice Orr (born 1918), Canadian aviator
Marion Orr (political scientist), American political scientist